Anna Sanchis (born 18 October 1987) is a Spanish former racing cyclist. She competed in the women's road race at the 2008 Summer Olympics.

Major results

2005
 National Junior Road Championships
1st  Time trial
2nd Road race
2008
 1st Estella
 2nd Time trial, National Road Championships
 7th Overall Giro d'Italia Femminile
 8th Road race, UEC European Under-23 Road Championships
2011
 2nd Time trial, National Road Championships
2012
 National Road Championships
1st  Time trial
1st  Road race
 9th Overall Emakumeen Euskal Bira
2013
 National Road Championships
1st  Time trial
9th Road race
2015
 National Road Championships
1st  Time trial
1st  Road race
 8th Giro dell'Emilia Internazionale Donne Elite
2016
 National Road Championships
1st  Time trial
2nd Road race
 7th Grand Prix de Plumelec-Morbihan Dames
 8th La Classique Morbihan

References

External links

1987 births
Living people
Spanish female cyclists
People from Costera
Sportspeople from the Province of Valencia
Olympic cyclists of Spain
Cyclists at the 2008 Summer Olympics
Cyclists from the Valencian Community
21st-century Spanish women